Jaroslav Procházka was a Czech middle-distance runner. He competed in the men's 800 metres at the 1920 Summer Olympics.

References

Year of birth missing
Year of death missing
Athletes (track and field) at the 1920 Summer Olympics
Czech male middle-distance runners
Olympic athletes of Czechoslovakia
Place of birth missing